Iain C. Duncan (born August 4, 1963) is a Canadian former professional ice hockey forward.

Early life 
Duncan was born in Toronto, Ontario. He played for the Bowling Green State University Falcons for four years, being named to their "all-century team" in 2000.

Career 
Duncan started his National Hockey League career with the Winnipeg Jets in 1987, where he played his entire NHL career. He was named to the NHL All-Rookie Team in 1988. After the 1991 season, Duncan then played the next eight seasons in minor leagues with several clubs. He retired from hockey after 1998.

From 2018 to 2020, he was the head coach and general manager of the minor professional Mentor Ice Breakers in the Federal Hockey League.

Awards and honours

Career statistics

Regular season and playoffs

References

External links

1963 births
Living people
Adirondack Red Wings players
Bowling Green Falcons men's ice hockey players
Canadian ice hockey forwards
Ice hockey people from Toronto
Moncton Hawks players
Nashville Nighthawks players
New Jersey Rockin' Rollers players
Phoenix Roadrunners (IHL) players
Toledo Storm players
Winnipeg Jets (1979–1996) draft picks
Winnipeg Jets (1979–1996) players
NCAA men's ice hockey national champions